As Sabʿain District is a district of the Amanat Al Asimah Governorate, Yemen. In 2003, the district had a population of 311,203 inhabitants.

References

Districts of Amanat Al Asimah Governorate